Bryolymnia anthracitaria is a moth of the family Noctuidae first described by Clifford D. Ferris and Noel McFarland in 2007. It is known only from south-eastern Arizona where it has been collected in oak scrub grassland.

Adults have been collected from late June to late August.

External links

Hadeninae
Moths described in 2007